The Ouachita River Bridge is a steel Parker through truss bridge carrying Arkansas Highway 7 and Arkansas Highway 51 across the Ouachita River at Arkadelphia, Arkansas. The trusses of the bridge were manufactured in 1933 by the Luten Bridge Company, and were first used to carry Highways 7 and US 67 over the Caddo River. That bridge was disassembled in the 1950s, and the trusses were stored until used to build this bridge in 1960. It is one of two crossings of the Ouachita River in Clark County.

The bridge was listed on the National Register of Historic Places in 2006. It is scheduled to be replaced in late 2018.

See also
National Register of Historic Places listings in Clark County, Arkansas
List of bridges on the National Register of Historic Places in Arkansas

References

Road bridges on the National Register of Historic Places in Arkansas
Bridges completed in 1933
Buildings and structures in Arkadelphia, Arkansas
National Register of Historic Places in Clark County, Arkansas
Relocated buildings and structures in Arkansas
Steel bridges in the United States
Parker truss bridges in the United States
Bridge (Arkadelphia, Arkansas)
1933 establishments in Arkansas
Luten bridges